The Western Canada Miners (also known as just the Canada Miners) are a professional independent baseball team based in Yuma, Arizona, and representing western Canada.  They play in the developmental Arizona Winter League, a short-season instructional winter league affiliated with the North American League and they play their home games at Desert Sun Stadium in Yuma, as well as the San Diego Surf Dawgs, Saskatchewan Silver Sox, Team Canada and Yuma Scorpions.  The team uses the logo and uniforms of the now-defunct Mesa Miners   team and are owned by Diamond Sports & Entertainment.

On April 3, 2009, the Miners were announced as one of the three charter teams in the new Arizona Summer League, an instructional league also affiliated with the Golden Baseball League.  The league was formed following the success of the AWL.  In July 2009, after 14 games and no playoff, they were declared the very first ASL Champions.  The ASL version was renamed the Bisbee Miners for 2010 and the Mesa Miners for 2011 and possibly beyond.

The NAL still owns the rights to the "Miners" brand (including name, logo and uniforms) and a future expansion team would have no ties to the original Mesa team.  Some suggest that previously sought-after Canadian cities Kamloops and Kelowna should be the new home of the brand because of western Canada's rich mining history, similar to the Saskatchewan team (Regina or Saskatoon are being sought to host the Silver Sox if they continue to express interest).

Season-by-season records
Arizona Winter League:

Arizona Summer League:

See also
 Mesa Miners
 Bisbee Miners

References

External links
 Arizona Winter League's official website
 Arizona Summer League's official website
 Golden Baseball League

Arizona Winter League teams
Professional baseball teams in Arizona